

2003

2004

2005

2006

2007

2008

2009

2010

2011

2012

2013

References

All-Ireland Senior Hurling Championship
Scorers